Pepperstock is a small village located in Central Bedfordshire, England. The village itself mostly consists of residential caravan parks. However, Pepperstock displays an interesting range of vernacular buildings, most notably in the form of 16th and 17th century timber framing with brick infill and red clay tiled roofs. It is in the civil parish of Slip End.

External links

Pepperstock pages at the Bedfordshire and Luton Archives and Records Service

Villages in Bedfordshire
Central Bedfordshire District